In elementary algebra, completing the square is a technique for converting a quadratic polynomial of the form

to the form

for some values of h and k.

In other words, completing the square places a perfect square trinomial inside of a quadratic expression.

Completing the square is used in
 solving quadratic equations,
 deriving the quadratic formula,
 graphing quadratic functions,
 evaluating integrals in calculus, such as Gaussian integrals with a linear term in the exponent,
 finding Laplace transforms.

In mathematics, completing the square is often applied in any computation involving quadratic polynomials.

History 

The technique of completing the square was known in the Old Babylonian Empire.

Muhammad ibn Musa Al-Khwarizmi, a famous polymath who wrote the early algebraic treatise Al-Jabr, used the technique of completing the square to solve quadratic equations.

Overview

Background
The formula in elementary algebra for computing the square of a binomial is:

For example:

In any perfect square, the coefficient of x is twice the number p, and the constant term is equal to p2.

Basic example
Consider the following quadratic polynomial:

This quadratic is not a perfect square, since 28 is not the square of 5:

However, it is possible to write the original quadratic as the sum of this square and a constant:

This is called completing the square.

General description
Given any monic quadratic

it is possible to form a square that has the same first two terms:

This square differs from the original quadratic only in the value of the constant
term. Therefore, we can write

where . This operation is known as completing the square.
For example:

Non-monic case
Given a quadratic polynomial of the form

it is possible to factor out the coefficient a, and then complete the square for the resulting monic polynomial.

Example:

This process of factoring out the coefficient a can further be simplified by only factorising it out of the first 2 terms. The integer at the end of the polynomial does not have to be included.

Example:

This allows the writing of any quadratic polynomial in the form

Formula

Scalar case
The result of completing the square may be written as a formula. In the general case, one has

with

In particular, when , one has

with

Matrix case
The matrix case looks very similar:

Note that  has to be symmetric.

Relation to the graph

In analytic geometry, the graph of any quadratic function is a parabola in the xy-plane. Given a quadratic polynomial of the form

the numbers h and k may be interpreted as the Cartesian coordinates of the vertex (or stationary point) of the parabola. That is, h is the x-coordinate of the axis of symmetry (i.e. the axis of symmetry has equation x = h), and k is the minimum value (or maximum value, if a < 0) of the quadratic function.

One way to see this is to note that the graph of the function  is a parabola whose vertex is at the origin (0, 0). Therefore, the graph of the function  is a parabola shifted to the right by h whose vertex is at (h, 0), as shown in the top figure.

Solving quadratic equations
Completing the square may be used to solve any quadratic equation. For example:

The first step is to complete the square:

Next we solve for the squared term:

Then either

and therefore

This can be applied to any quadratic equation. When the x2 has a coefficient other than 1, the first step is to divide out the equation by this coefficient: for an example see the non-monic case below.

Irrational and complex roots
Unlike methods involving factoring the equation, which is reliable only if the roots are rational, completing the square will find the roots of a quadratic equation even when those roots are irrational or complex. For example, consider the equation

Completing the square gives

so

Then either

In terser language:

so

Equations with complex roots can be handled in the same way. For example:

Non-monic case
For an equation involving a non-monic quadratic, the first step to solving them is to divide through by the coefficient of x2. For example:

Applying this procedure to the general form of a quadratic equation leads to the quadratic formula.

Other applications

Integration
Completing the square may be used to evaluate any integral of the form

using the basic integrals

For example, consider the integral

Completing the square in the denominator gives:

This can now be evaluated by using the substitution
u = x + 3, which yields

Complex numbers
Consider the expression

where z and b are complex numbers, z* and b* are the complex conjugates of z and b, respectively, and c is a real number. Using the identity |u|2 = uu* we can rewrite this as

which is clearly a real quantity. This is because

As another example, the expression

where a, b, c, x, and y are real numbers, with a > 0 and b > 0, may be expressed in terms of the square of the absolute value of a complex number. Define

Then

so

Idempotent matrix
A matrix M is idempotent when M2 = M. Idempotent matrices generalize the idempotent properties of 0 and 1. The completion of the square method of addressing the equation 

shows that some idempotent 2×2 matrices are parametrized by a circle in the (a,b)-plane:

The matrix  will be idempotent provided  which, upon completing the square, becomes

In the (a,b)-plane, this is the equation of a circle with center (1/2, 0) and radius 1/2.

Geometric perspective

Consider completing the square for the equation

Since x2 represents the area of a square with side of length x, and bx represents the area of a rectangle with sides b and x, the process of completing the square can be viewed as visual manipulation of rectangles.

Simple attempts to combine the x2 and the bx rectangles into a larger square result in a missing corner. The term (b/2)2 added to each side of the above equation is precisely the area of the missing corner, whence derives the terminology "completing the square".

A variation on the technique
As conventionally taught, completing the square consists of adding the third term, v to

to get a square. There are also cases in which one can add the middle term, either 2uv or −2uv, to

to get a square.

Example: the sum of a positive number and its reciprocal
By writing

we show that the sum of a positive number x and its reciprocal is always greater than or equal to 2. The square of a real expression is always greater than or equal to zero, which gives the stated bound; and here we achieve 2 just when x is 1, causing the square to vanish.

Example: factoring a simple quartic polynomial
Consider the problem of factoring the polynomial

This is

so the middle term is 2(x2)(18) = 36x2. Thus we get

(the last line being added merely to follow the convention of decreasing degrees of terms).

The same argument shows that  is always factorizable as 

(Also known as Sophie Germain's identity).

Related techniques

Completing the cube

Just like completing the square can be used to solve quadratic equations, the similar technique completing the cube can be used to solve repressed cubic equations.

References

Algebra 1, Glencoe, pages 539–544
Algebra 2, Saxon, pages 214–214, 241–242, 256–257, 398–401

External links

Elementary algebra
Articles containing proofs
Articles containing video clips